The Hardanger Line was a  railway between Voss and Granvin in Hordaland, Norway. The line connected to the Bergen Line in Voss, and ran to the Hardangerfjord and the district of Hardanger. Construction started in 1921, but the line did not open until 1 April 1935. Owned and operated by the Norwegian State Railways (NSB), the passenger transport was provided by three NSB Class 64 electric multiple units. They remained in use until 1985, when passenger transport was terminated. The  from Voss to Palmafoss remains, and is owned by the Norwegian National Rail Administration. The line featured six stations, fourteen halts, four tunnels and was among Norway's steepest railways. It was NSB's first line to open electrified. The line was known as the Granvin Line until February 1936. In 2016 Palmafoss established an emergency freight terminal and the tracks were reestablished.

Route

The Hardanger Line ran  from Voss to Granvin in Hardanger. From Voss to Skjervet, the line ran in relatively flat terrain, with easy construction. Along this section the route followed what is now Norwegian National Road 13. At Skjervet, the two split; towards Nesheim the gradient increased and the topography became more difficult. On this section there were four tunnels, named Skjervet Tunnel I through IV, the longest being . Between the two longest tunnels, the line was built on a shelf. From Skjervet, the railway ran on the west side of the river Granvinvatnet, while the road ran on the east side.

The system had stations with buildings at Voss, Palmafoss, Mønshaug, Skjervet, Nesheim and Granvin. In addition, there were halts at Haugamo, Kinne, Bjørgum, Mala, Dalsleitet, Flatlandsmo, Såkvitno, Selland and Kolanes.

Granvin is a port on the Hardangerfjord and was the center for freight transport in Hardanger. Hardanger is dominated by a small number of large industrial companies, primarily smelters, which were responsible for more than 80 percent of the line's cargo volume. While Hardanger in the 1980s had a population of 40,000, Granvin had a population of 1,000 and was the smallest municipality in Hardanger. Granvin served as a ferry hub for services by Hardanger Sunnhordlandske Dampskipsselskap (HSD), and in 1980 there up to two daily services with the local ferry services in Hardanger, in addition to fast ferries to both Bergen and Stavanger. Buses operated to Granvin from Norheimsund and Kvanndal.

From there to Skjervet, the line has been asphalted, and is used as a hiking and bicycle path. The section from Skjervet to Nesheim is disused, although it has been proposed used as a road. From Nesheim the hiking and bicycle path continues, although the last kilometer before Granvin the right-of-way is disused. The station buildings at Nesheim and Granvin remain, but the ones at Palmafoss, Mønshaug and Skjervet has been demolished.

In 2016 Palmafoss established an emergency freight terminal for the Bergen line. If the Bergen Line is closed, freight can be transferred to trucks at Palmafoss. At the same time the tracks were renovated and reestablished between Voss and Palmafoss.

History
During construction of the Voss Line from Bergen to Voss, there was a proposal to extend the line from Voss to Granvin on the Hardangerfjord. The plans were again taken up to consideration with the construction of the Bergen Line, but also this time the plans were scrapped. Some people wanted the line to be a tramway and when it was passed by the Parliament of Norway on 12 July 1919; the plans incorporated some elements of a tramway, giving the line a lower standard than the mainline. The railway was to be built electrified, and construction started in 1921. However, there was a lack of engineers, forcing a slow pace. On 5 November 1923, parliament passed the final plans for the railway, and the pace of construction was accelerated.

In 1927, Minister of Labour Worm Hirsch Darre-Jenssen of the Conservative Party stopped the work on the railway, stating that time had run out and that there instead should be built a road. By then,  had been invested and parliament decided that construction should continue. However, Darre-Jenssen convinced Hordaland County Council to make a statement against the Hardanger Line, the Flåm Line and the Namsos Line, without this stopping construction. In 1931, parliament reconsidered the electrification of the line, and there was consensus for electrification. The Hardanger Line opened on 1 April 1935 and became NSB's first line to be electrified at the time of opening. In February 1936, the line changed name from the Granvin Line to the Hardanger Line.

Three Class 64 electric multiple units (EMU) were delivered from Strømmens Værksted in 1934. In addition, four passenger cars were delivered, with each multiple unit able to haul two passenger cars. Occasionally, Class 64 trains were used on the Flåm Line, after it was electrified in 1944, and El 9-hauled trains from the Flåm Line used on the Hardanger Line.

In the first year of operation, the line had 60,850 passengers, significantly over expectations. After the opening, there were five daily round trips. In 1939, the extension of the longest tunnel started, because the nearby section was subject to landslides. It was completed by the German occupational forces during World War II, but not taken into use by the railway until 1945 because of the German military's use of the tunnel as an ammunition depot. Because of the electric traction, the line was not affected by the lack of coal during World War II, and in 1945 it had 285,900 passengers. After the end of the war, the number of daily round trips increased to seven, but this was reduced to six in the 1950s. In 1955, a morning and evening coach service started between Granvin and Voss. It was further extended in 1968, when it started corresponding with services on the Bergen Line.

Initially, the freight transport was small. During the war, transport increased many-fold, particularly because of export of lumber. In 1966, a spur was built just south of Palmafoss to Voss Cementvarefabrikk. By the end of the 1960s, the line was transporting . During the late 1970s, the amount of transport fel dramatically, and reached  in 1980. Nearly half of this was import of lumber to three sawmills and manufacturing companies. In 1972, Linjegods established a daily scheduled truck service to Granvin. Although Linjegods used train to and from Voss, the service from Voss to Granvin was operated parallel to the railway. In 1975, Tollpost Globe also established a similar service between Voss and Granvin. Another issue for the line was that it has a permitted axle load of only ; this either prohibited optimal wagon weights on the main lines, or causing transshipment at Voss, both causing increased costs.

In 1980, the line had NOK 2.1 million in income, of which NOK 1.6 million was from freight (representing all revenue from freight that ran on the Hardanger Line). Operating expenses were NOK 4.8 million, and the deficit was covered by the national government. The line employed 21 people. In 1980, the estimated cost of upgrading the line to  axle load was NOK 9.6 million. Freight volume was then estimated to increase between 100 and 300 percent, and an upgrade was calculated to give a positive net present value, although it would not be sufficient to cover the full existing deficit. The plans included introduction of a refrigerated depot at Granvin. At the same time, it was estimated that the cost of retaining a  axle load would require investments of NOK 6 million.

In 1979, the concession for passenger transport between Voss and Granvin was transferred from NSB's bus division to HSD and Bergen–Hardanger–Voss Billag. At the same time, the number of weekly services increased from 14 to 34. This was largely a result of the 1975 declaration by Hordaland County Council to support the closure of the line. In 1980, the railway had 60,000 passengers. A halt was opened at Mala in 1981, but then all passenger traffic was terminated on 2 June 1985. Class 64 had remained in use until the end, and there existed no political desire to invest in new rolling stock. Freight transport was retained, at first using El 9, and later shunting locomotives because of the lack of maintenance. From 1 March 1989, all transport on the line was terminated. NSB wanted to renovate the line and continue operations. Among the plans were to transport metal from the smelters in Hardanger via the Hardanger Line to Continental Europe. This would have required the axle load to be increased. Other plans were to extend some of the departures of the Bergen Commuter Rail from Voss to Granvin or operate commercially profitable tourist trains similar to the service provided on the Flåm Line.

The municipalities of Voss and Granvin wanted to use the right-of-way for a hiking and bicycle path, and NSB canceled their plans. Demolition started on 10 December 1991, although the section from Voss to Palmafoss was kept to serve a cement factory. Two of the Class 64 trains have been preserved by the Norwegian Railway Association and are based at the Old Voss Line in Bergen.

References

Sources

External links

Jernbane.net pictures from Hardangerbanen 

 
Railway lines in Norway
Railway lines in Vestland
Railway lines opened in 1935
Railway lines closed in 1988
1935 establishments in Norway
Voss